Wing of Zion (Hebrew: כנף ציון, Knaf Tzion) is the official aircraft of the Prime Minister of Israel and the President of the State of Israel, at their service during their official visits outside the Israeli borders (in roughly 10 flights a year). It is a Boeing 767-338ER passenger aircraft, which formerly belonged to Australian Airlines and Qantas and was, at the time of its purchase by Israel, about 20 years old. On November 3, 2019, the aircraft conducted its first test flight.

The original budget for its purchase, conversion and upgrade was 393 million shekels ($115 million), which by the time it first flew had grown by 50 percent to 580 million shekels. Operating the plane is expected to cost taxpayers 44.6 million shekels annually. Buying a dedicated plane was criticized – especially after it vastly exceeded the original budget – and its inauguration was postponed several times. In 2020 it was reported that the office of then Prime Minister Benjamin Netanyahu had ordered the plane be grounded, fearing it would draw criticism during a major economic crisis with mounting unemployment as a result of the coronavirus pandemic.

On December 7, 2021, after provoking controversy as to its necessity and as a result remaining grounded, the aircraft received final approval and completed its registration and inspection process by the Israeli Civil Aviation Authority. Despite this, according to reports, the new PM Naftali Bennett had not yet decided whether to use the aircraft. 

In May 2022 it was announced that it would be transferred to maintenance storage in a specially constructed hangar at the Nevatim Israeli Air Force base, pending a decision on its future use. Lapid later approved sale of the plane for civilian use, after all the high-level defense mechanisms on it were removed.

The plane is also referred to in the media as "Israeli Air Force 1", after the well known Air Force One of the United States.

References

External links
 767 production list
Aviation in Israel
Presidential aircraft
Individual aircraft